Hirtella pauciflora is a species of plant in the family Chrysobalanaceae. It is endemic to Ecuador. Its natural habitat is subtropical or tropical moist lowland forests. The specific epithet pauciflora is Latin for 'few-flowered'.

References

pauciflora
Endemic flora of Ecuador
Endangered plants
Taxonomy articles created by Polbot